Mary Bernard Dickson (c.1811 – 5 August 1895) was a New Zealand nun, nurse and teacher. She was born in Ipswich, Suffolk, England c.1811. She worked under Florence Nightingale in the Crimean War. Dickson moved to New Zealand in 1857 where she became a superior of the Sisters of Mercy.

References

1811 births
1895 deaths
New Zealand educators
New Zealand nurses
English emigrants to New Zealand
19th-century New Zealand people
New Zealand women nurses

Sisters of Mercy